The Luxembourg Philharmonic Orchestra, abbreviated to OPL, is a symphony orchestra based in Luxembourg City, Luxembourg.  The orchestra formerly performed at the Grand Théâtre de la Ville de Luxembourg and the Conservatoire de Luxembourg.  Its current home is the Philharmonie Luxembourg, a large concert hall opened in 2005 in the Kirchberg quarter in the northeast of the city.

History
The orchestra was founded in 1933 as the in-house orchestra of RTL Radio, named the RTL Grand Symphony Orchestra; Henri Pensis was its founder and first music director. After his initial tenure from 1933 to 1939, Pensis went into exile in the USA in the wake of World War II.  He returned to Luxembourg in 1946 to resume direction of the orchestra.  After Pensis died in 1958, Carl Melles was the orchestra's music director in 1958.  Louis de Froment subsequently became music director and held the post from 1958 to 1980.  Leopold Hager succeeded de Froment in 1981, and served for 15 years to 1996.

Following the 1991 privatisation of the Compagnie Luxembourgeoise de Radiodiffusion, in 1995, RTL decided not to renew its contract with the orchestra.  Subsequently, the Luxembourg government established the Henri Pensis Foundation to allow for the orchestra to continue its existence.  In 1996, the orchestra acquired its current name under its new auspices.

The orchestra's fifth music director, David Shallon suddenly died in 2000 while on tour in Japan.  Bramwell Tovey took over as music director in September 2002, and held the post until 2006.  The OPL appointed Emmanuel Krivine as their music director starting from the 2005-2006 season.  In May 2009, Krivine extended his contract with the orchestra through the 2014-2015 season.  Krivine concluded his OPL tenure at the end of the 2014–2015 season. In June 2014, the OPL announced the appointment of Gustavo Gimeno as its next principal conductor, as of the 2015-2016 season, with an initial contract of 4 years.  In March 2017, the OPL announced the extension of Gimeno's contract through the 2021-2022 season.  In February 2020, the OPL announced a further extension of Gimeno's contract through the 2024-2025 season.  Gimeno is scheduled to conclude his OPL tenure at the close of the 2024-2025 season.

Music directors
 Henri Pensis (1933-1939; 1946-1958)
 Carl Melles (1958)
 Louis de Froment (1958-1980)
 Leopold Hager (1981-1996)
 David Shallon (1997-2000)
 Bramwell Tovey (2002-2006)
 Emmanuel Krivine (2006–2015)
 Gustavo Gimeno (2015–present)

Selected discography 
Debussy - La Mer. Gustavo Gimeno , Orchestre Philharmonique Luxembourg. PENTATONE PTC 5186627 (2018).
Stravinsky - The Rite of Spring. Gustavo Gimeno , Orchestre Philharmonique Luxembourg. PENTATONE PTC 5186650 (2018).
Mahler - Symphony No. 4. Gustavo Gimeno, Miah Persson, Orchestre Philharmonique Luxembourg. PENTATONE PTC 5186651 (2018).
Ravel - Daphnis et Chloé. Gustavo Gimeno, Orchestre Philharmonique Luxembourg, WDR Rundfunkchor Köln. PENTATONE PTC 5186652 (2017).
Shostakovich - Symphony No. 1 & other short works. Gustavo Gimeno, Orchestre Philharmonique Luxembourg. PENTATONE PTC 5186622  (2017).
Bruckner - Symphony No. 1 & 4 Orchestral Pieces. Gustavo Gimeno, Orchestre Philharmonique Luxembourg. PENTATONE PTC 5186613 (2017).

References

External links
  Luxembourg Philharmonic Orchestra official website
 Radio Swiss Classic French-language page on the history of the orchestra
 New World Classics biography of the orchestra

Philharmonic Orchestra
Philharmonic Orchestra
European orchestras
Musical groups established in 1933
Arts organizations established in 1933